Robert Rey (born March 25, 1934) is a French ski jumper who competed in the 1950s and the 1960s and was part of the French National Team from 1959 to 1962. He is a younger brother of Régis Rey.

Notes

References
 Robert Rey at Sports Reference

1934 births
Living people
Olympic ski jumpers of France
French male ski jumpers
Ski jumpers at the 1960 Winter Olympics